Room Temperature is a live album by Peter Hammill, originally released on Enigma Records in 1990.  On its initial release, the album was only available in North America.  It was subsequently re-released on Hammill's own Fie! label.

The album documents Hammill's 1990 tour of Europe and North America.  Hammill's group for this tour consisted of Stuart Gordon on violin and former Van der Graaf Generator bassist Nic Potter on bass.  There was no drummer, hence some of the songs on these recordings have a stripped down, chamber music feel.  The group was briefly billed as the Peter Hammill Band.

Initial copies of this double live CD came in a longbox.

Track listing
All tracks composed by Peter Hammill; except where indicated
Disc one
"The Wave" (03:43)
"Just Good Friends" (05:15)
"Vision" (04:52)
"Time to Burn" (05:00)
"Four Pails" (Chris Judge Smith, Max Hutchinson) - (06:42)
"The Comet, the Course, the Tail" (09:19)
"Ophelia" (04:20)
"Happy Hour" (09:14)
"If I Could" (06:03)
"Something About Ysabel's Dance" (07:27)
"Patient" (10:02)

Disc two

"Cat's Eye/Yellow Fever (Running)" (Graham Smith, Peter Hammill) - (06:06)
"Skin" (05:30)
"Hemlock" (08:23)
"Our Oyster" (07:12)
"The Unconscious Life" (06:03)
"After the Show" (10:57)
"A Way Out" (08:46)
"The Future Now" (04:06)
"Traintime" (06:40)
"Modern" (10:03)

Personnel 

Peter Hammill – vocals, guitar, keyboards
Stuart Gordon – violin
Nic Potter – bass

References

Peter Hammill live albums
1990 live albums
Enigma Records live albums